The pseudocircle is the finite topological space X consisting of four distinct points {a,b,c,d&hairsp;} with the following non-Hausdorff topology:

This topology corresponds to the partial order  where open sets are downward-closed sets. X is highly pathological from the usual viewpoint of general topology as it fails to satisfy any separation axiom besides T0. However, from the viewpoint of algebraic topology X has the remarkable property that it is indistinguishable from the circle S1.

More precisely the continuous map  from S1 to X (where we think of S1 as the unit circle in ) given by

is a weak homotopy equivalence, that is  induces an isomorphism on all homotopy groups. It follows<ref>Allen Hatcher (2002) Algebraic Topology, Proposition 4.21, Cambridge University Press</ref> that  also induces an isomorphism on singular homology and cohomology and more generally an isomorphism on all ordinary or extraordinary homology and cohomology theories (e.g., K-theory).

This can be proved using the following observation. Like S1, X is the union of two contractible open sets {a,b,c} and {a,b,d&hairsp;} whose intersection {a,b} is also the union of two disjoint contractible open sets {a} and {b}. So like S1, the result follows from the groupoid Seifert-van Kampen theorem, as in the book Topology and Groupoids.

More generally McCord has shown that for any finite simplicial complex K, there is a finite topological space XK which has the same weak homotopy type as the geometric realization |K| of K. More precisely there is a functor, taking K to XK, from the category of finite simplicial complexes and simplicial maps and a natural weak homotopy equivalence from |K| to X''K.

See also

References

Algebraic topology
Topological spaces